Fabrizio Donato (born 14 August 1976) is an Italian athlete competing in the triple jump and occasionally in the long jump. He is known for winning gold medals at the 2001 Mediterranean Games and the 2009 European Indoor Championships, the latter in a new championship record of 17.59 metres. He is the Italian record holder with 17.60 metres outdoor and 17.73 indoor.

Biography
He was born in Frosinone. He participated at the 2000 Olympic Games without reaching the final. He cleared the 17-metre mark for the first time in June 2000 at the Notturna di Milano meeting – his mark of 17.60 m was a significant personal best and also improved Paolo Camossi's Italian record by 31 centimetres. This was the second best jump in Europe that year. In the same year he also became Italian champion for the first time. His main competitor around that time was Camossi.

In 2001 he finished sixth at the 2001 World Indoor Championships and won the gold medal at the 2001 Mediterranean Games. The winning result of 17.05 metres was his season's best. It was almost a championship record as well, but Marios Hadjiandreou's 17.13 metres from 1991 was slightly better. In 2002 he reached 17 metres for the first time indoor, with 17.03 metres in Genoa in February. He finished fourth at both the 2002 European Indoor Championships and the 2002 European Championships in the summer. In the latter competition he jumped 17.15 metres, and his season's best was 17.17.

Then, some less successful years followed. He competed without reaching the final at the 2003 World Championships, the 2004 World Indoor Championships and the 2004 Olympic Games. He failed to reach the 17-metre mark at all in 2004 and 2005. In 2006 he experienced an improvement with 17.33 metres indoor (Ancona, February) and 17.24 metres outdoor (Turin, July), but failed to reach the final at both the 2006 World Indoor Championships and the 2006 European Championships. He did however win the European Cup Super League meeting in June, reaching 16.99 metres. In 2007 he again failed to reach 17 metres, and again failed to reach the final of a major competition, this time at the 2007 World Championships.

2008 and 2009 would be marked by fruitful indoor seasons and fruitless outdoor seasons. He finished fourth in the final at the 2008 World Indoor Championships with a mark of 17.27 metres, but after with Fabio Martella he won the gold medal at the 2009 European Indoor Championships with a mark of 17.59 metres. These two marks were the season's best of the respective years. 17.59 was also a new championship record for the European Indoor Championships. In comparison, he only managed 16.91 outdoors in 2008 and only 15.81 outdoors in 2009. He had unsuccessful participations at the 2008 Olympic Games and the 2009 World Championships.

His personal best jump is still 17.60 metres, and 17.73 metres on the indoor track. He is the Italian record holder. In the long jump he has 8.00 metres outdoors, achieved in September 2006 in Busto Arsizio with the maximum possible wind assistance, and 8.03 metres indoors, achieved in February 2011 in Ancona.

At the 2012 Summer Olympics, he jumped 17.48 metres to win the bronze medal.

He's the husband of the former sprinter Patrizia Spuri.

Achievements

Progression

National titles
He has won 23 times the individual national championship.

8 wins in the triple jump (2000, 2004, 2006, 2007, 2008, 2010, 2011, 2015)
3 wins in the long jump indoor (1999, 2011, 2012)
12 wins in the triple jump indoor (1998, 1999, 2001, 2002, 2003, 2004, 2006, 2007, 2008, 2009, 2010, 2018)

See also
 Italian records in athletics
 Italian all-time lists - Triple jump
 Italian Athletics Championships - Multi winners
 World records in masters athletics - Triple jump
 Masters M40 triple jump world record progression

References

External links
 
 

1976 births
Living people
People from Latina, Lazio
Italian male triple jumpers
Italian male long jumpers
Athletes (track and field) at the 2000 Summer Olympics
Athletes (track and field) at the 2004 Summer Olympics
Athletes (track and field) at the 2008 Summer Olympics
Athletes (track and field) at the 2012 Summer Olympics
Athletes (track and field) at the 2016 Summer Olympics
Olympic athletes of Italy
Olympic bronze medalists for Italy
Athletics competitors of Fiamme Gialle
European Athletics Championships medalists
Medalists at the 2012 Summer Olympics
Olympic bronze medalists in athletics (track and field)
Mediterranean Games gold medalists for Italy
Athletes (track and field) at the 2001 Mediterranean Games
World Athletics Championships athletes for Italy
Italian masters athletes
World record holders in masters athletics
Olympic male triple jumpers
Italian athletics coaches
European athletics champions for Italy
Mediterranean Games medalists in athletics
Italian Athletics Championships winners
Sportspeople from the Province of Latina